Thomas Joseph Sugrue (1907–1953) was an American writer. He is best known today as the writer of There Is a River, the only biography of Edgar Cayce written during Cayce’s lifetime and the book that made the psychic a household name in 1942. He also lent his writing talents to the Edgar Cayce Association for Research and Enlightenment for numerous articles and news items.

Life
Thomas Sugrue was born in a house on Ward Street in Naugatuck, Connecticut, in 1907 to Michael and Mary Sugrue. He grew up in a staunch Irish Catholic background. His father worked as a mail carrier. His early memories of life in the borough's Irish section were captured in a 1940 autobiographical novel, Such Is the Kingdom, which was recast as the fictional "Kelly Hill".

After graduating in 1924 from Naugatuck High School where dancing was "his favorite pastime" according to a yearbook, Sugrue worked briefly as a teller for the Naugatuck Savings Bank, before attending Washington and Lee University in Virginia, where he graduated with bachelor's and master's degrees in English.

It was there he was introduced to classmate Hugh Lynn Cayce, the eldest son of Edgar and Gertrude Cayce. Edgar Cayce had the strange gift of going into a trance-like state and providing answers to questions. The subjects included diagnosis and treatment of illness, finding hidden items, universal laws, karma, and even past lives.

Sugrue made the five-hour trip from Lexington to Virginia Beach with Hugh Lynn, thinking that he would debunk a fraud. After meeting Edgar Cayce, he decided that there was no deception.  His first reading was given in Virginia Beach on June 7, 1927, at the request of Hugh Lynn.

Sugrue worked as a reporter at the former Naugatuck Daily News, before being hired by the New York Herald Tribune newspaper. In 1934, he joined the staff of The American Magazine and wrote articles covering Athens, Egypt, Palestine, England, and more as he traveled the world. Copies of every issue of The American Magazine between 1934 and 1938 are available for view at the reference desk of the Whittemore Memorial Library in Naugatuck, Connecticut.

At this point, he was taken ill from a rare arthritis disease. Innovatively treated in a clinic for weeks, he left it as a dying person with a few weeks to live. After seeking relief for his condition in Florida, Sugrue moved to Virginia Beach in June 1939 and lived at the Cayces' home until October 1941. With Hugh Lynn Cayce as his nurse, he received readings from Edgar Cayce and treatments for his condition.

On file at Edgar Cayce's A.R.E. headquarters in Virginia Beach are a total of 76 documented psychic readings given specifically for Sugrue by Cayce and a collection of Sugrue's writings. It was during this time that he wrote There Is a River, the biography of Edgar Cayce.

During his lifetime, he wrote seven books, including Starling of the White House, with and for Edmund Starling, the man who protected all U.S. presidents from Woodrow Wilson to Franklin Delano Roosevelt, hosted a New York City radio show Conversations at Eight, and explored the nation of Israel.

"We called it music" - A generation of Jazz, written with and about jazz musician Eddie Condon, is an account of the birth of that musical genre, stretching from lively descriptions of Eddie Condon's life to deep philosophical interpretations.

Watch for the Morning is a report on the events which led to the creation of the State of Israel. With the many questions on esoteric themes he would ask to Arab, Jew and Druze circles he would meet in this process, Watch for the Morning phrases an answer that still has to be put in shared sentences nowadays.

With his 1952 A Catholic Speaks His Mind, his shortest and last book, he puts Christianity in the perspective of religion seen as a universal, structural part of the human civilization.

He died at the age of 45 in 1953 in New York, during a hip replacement meant to help him walk again.

A letter dated July 15, 1954, from Hugh Lynn Cayce to members of A.R.E. announced the establishment of the Thomas Sugrue Memorial Library at Wainwright House, in Rye, New York. It contains a collection of Sugrue's work.

References

1907 births
1953 deaths
20th-century American writers
20th-century American male writers